Ceresa, commonly known as buffalo treehoppers, is a genus of treehoppers. It contains about 16 species.

Ceresa albescens
Ceresa albidosparsa
Ceresa alta
Ceresa ancora
Ceresa basalis
Ceresa borealis
Ceresa diceros
Ceresa festina
Ceresa franciscanus
Ceresa inermis
Ceresa lutea
Ceresa pacifica
Ceresa palmeri
Ceresa stimulea
Ceresa tauriniformis

References

Insect pests of temperate forests
Smiliinae
Auchenorrhyncha genera